Thabang Sesinyi (born 15 October 1992) is a Botswanan football midfielder who currently plays for Jwaneng Galaxy.

References

1992 births
Living people
Botswana footballers
Botswana international footballers
Notwane F.C. players
Orapa United F.C. players
Jwaneng Galaxy F.C. players
Platinum Stars F.C. players
Cape Umoya United F.C. players
Association football midfielders
Botswana expatriate footballers
Expatriate soccer players in South Africa
Botswana expatriate sportspeople in South Africa
South African Premier Division players